Silver Airways LLC. is a United States regional airline with its headquarters in Fort Lauderdale–Hollywood International Airport in Broward County, Florida, near Fort Lauderdale. It was founded in 2011 with assets from the former Gulfstream International Airlines, and currently operates scheduled flights from its hubs in Fort Lauderdale, Orlando, and Tampa, Florida; and a smaller base in San Juan, Puerto Rico. It started flying on December 15, 2011.

 Silver Airways received $20,515,042 in annual Federal subsidies for Essential Air Services that it provided to rural airports in the United States.

History 
On November 4, 2010, Gulfstream International Airlines filed for Chapter 11 Bankruptcy protection. In May 2011, Victory Park Capital bought the assets of Gulfstream International Group, including 21 of Gulfstream's Beechcraft 1900D aircraft from Raytheon Aircraft Credit Corporation. The company had been operating as Continental Connection on behalf of Continental Airlines.

On December 15, 2011, the airline was re-branded as Silver Airways. That same day, they took delivery of one of six recently purchased Saab 340B+ aircraft. Upon the merger of Continental Airlines into United Airlines on April 1, 2012, Silver operated as United Express until the affiliation with United ended in 2013.

In the first half of 2012, Silver Airways made several moves to turn the company around. Its maintenance facilities were moved from Fort Lauderdale to Gainesville Regional Airport, taking over the former Eclipse Aviation facility that had remained vacant since 2009. It purchased six more Saab 340B+ aircraft bringing the Saab fleet to 12. Scheduled service on the Saabs started on the Florida and Bahamas routes. Shortly after, routes from Gainesville Regional Airport to Orlando International Airport and Tampa International Airport began. Silver Airways expanded their network numerous times in the second half of 2012. First, Washington Dulles International Airport started scheduled service to destinations in Pennsylvania, West Virginia, and Virginia. Its Florida route network expanded to Jacksonville. Service began from Hartsfield-Jackson Atlanta International Airport to destinations in Mississippi and Alabama. On August 7, 2012, Silver Airways made national news headlines when one of its flights landed at the wrong airport.

In Late 2011 Silver Airways began a new operation in Montana serving eight cities from a hub at Billings. Seven of the eight cities were served through government subsidies by way of Essential Air Service contracts.

On February 11, 2013, Victory Park Capital announced it had hired industry veteran Dave Pflieger to strengthen and grow the airline. On June 28, 2013, Silver Airways announced that it would cease Montana operations over the next few months. The announcement came on the heels of the Department of Transportation's (DOT) decision to eliminate subsidized service in two key Montana communities, Lewistown and Miles City. Service ended after the last flights on July 15, 2013, for Lewistown and Miles City. To ensure no interruption of service and a smooth transition for the flying public in the remaining Montana markets serviced by Silver Airways, Silver continued its operations in those communities until such time as the DOT awarded the routes to another airline and the new carrier started service to those communities. In September 2013, Silver Airways announced an expansion of its intra-Florida and Florida-Bahamas network. In 2013, Silver Airways was named one of the Top 10 Best U.S. Airlines in the Condé Nast Traveler's 26th annual Readers' Choice Awards.

In the first half of 2014, Silver Airways made several network changes. It ended Beechcraft 1900 operations in Cleveland's EAS network. Then, Silver Airways closed much of its Atlanta network and redeployed its aircraft to other markets. In February 2014, the airline and its owners, Victory Park Capital, announced they had obtained up to $73 million in additional financing from GB Credit Partners, LLC, the investment management affiliate of Gordon Brothers Group and Crystal Financial LLC. In February 2014, Silver Airways announced it planned to exit its Cleveland Network, retire its Beech 1900Ds, and strengthen its core network and Saab 340B Plus fleet. In March 2014, Silver Airways completed its first ever IATA Operational Safety Audit (IOSA). In May 2014, Silver announced a new partnership with JetBlue. In May 2014, Silver Airways announced it was a new stand-alone airline after the launch of its own independent reservations system, CEO Dave Pflieger described the airline as a hybrid carrier, part start-up, part turnaround, both independent and a partner to a larger airline (United). He also noted that it was "rationalizing" its fleet and network and "only flying where it makes sense", so the airline could not only meet but exceed guests' expectations and continue to grow the airline.

In January 2015, Silver Airways added Panama City, Florida, to its list of destinations, by starting services to Orlando and Tampa from the Northwest Florida Beaches International Airport. It also announced the launch of a direct service between Jacksonville and Tampa. On February 27, 2015, Silver Airways previewed its new maintenance headquarters at Orlando International Airport. The project is a complete renovation that will be home to a 38,000 square-foot maintenance, repair and overhaul facility that includes two large aircraft hangars each capable of housing three to four aircraft, as well as office space. Silver Airways has committed to a long-term 30-year lease from the Greater Orlando Aviation Authority to headquarter its new maintenance facility in Orlando. In August 2015, Silver Airways ended its Gainesville service, several months after missing and restructuring payments on its Gainesville maintenance hangar.

On March 2, 2016, Silver Airways filed an application with the U.S. Department of Transportation to provide service from five Florida cities to ten Cuban cities. However, later, Silver Airways was only granted nine Cuban cities, being denied the Havana route. On June 2, 2016, Silver Airways, Great Lakes Airlines and Frontier Airlines announced a partnership for recruiting pilots. On September 13, 2016, it was announced that a majority stake of Silver Airways has been acquired by a private equity firm Versa Capital Management LLC in Philadelphia. On August 1, 2017, Silver Airways announced an order for 20 ATR-42-600 aircraft, with options for up to 30 more.

On April 23, 2018, Silver Airways announced the acquisition of Seaborne Airlines, a San Juan-based airline serving the Caribbean. In November 2019, Silver Airways created a codeshare partnership with Delta Air Lines and American Airlines to provide single ticket booking with baggage transfers to destinations in the Caribbean.

In February 2020, Silver Airways announced new services to Charleston International Airport from its hubs in Fort Lauderdale, Orlando, and Tampa, however due to the COVID-19 pandemic and its impacts on aviation, the services were initially postponed until November 2020 when service was started. In March 2020, the airline announced the introduction of its own services to its San Juan base previously acquired along with its subsidiary Seaborne Airlines, with routes from San Juan launching in phases between March and July 2020 as more of the airline's ATR 42-600 aircraft would be delivered.

On November 9, 2021, Silver Airways began contract flying for Amazon Air with feeder flights from Albuquerque, New Mexico and Des Moines, Iowa to Amazon's hub at the Fort Worth Alliance Airport near Fort Worth, Texas. Silver is using two ATR-72-500 aircraft configured for airfreight operations and painted with Amazon's "Prime Air" logo.

Facilities 
The airline headquarters are located in Suite 201 of the 1100 Lee Wagener Boulevard building on the property of Fort Lauderdale–Hollywood International Airport in unincorporated Broward County, Florida, near Fort Lauderdale. Previously its headquarters were in Dania Beach, Florida, also near Fort Lauderdale. The airline also maintains a maintenance facility at Orlando International Airport in a facility previously utilized by Comair.

Destinations 

Over its history, Silver Airways has domestically operated both scheduled commercial flights originating from its Fort Lauderdale, Orlando, and Tampa hubs in Florida, as well as Essential Air Services based in Atlanta (Georgia), Billings (Montana), Boston (Massachusetts), Cleveland (Ohio), and Washington D.C. Internationally, the airline operates services between Florida and the Bahamas, and in March 2020 began its own operations based in San Juan (Puerto Rico) to surrounding destinations in the Caribbean, alongside those of its subsidiary Seaborne Airlines.

Interline and codeshare agreements 
Silver Airways does not participate in any major global airline alliances, but the airline has interline and codeshare agreements with several airlines. Many of the following airlines are also members of global airline alliances:

 Avianca
 Air Canada
 Alaska Airlines
 American Airlines
 All Nippon Airways
 Azul Brazilian Airlines
 Bahamasair
 Delta Air Lines
 JetBlue Airways
 United Airlines

Fleet 
, The Silver Airways fleet consists of the following aircraft:

Historical fleet
Beechcraft 1900D
Saab 340

References

External links 
 Official website

2011 establishments in Florida
Airlines established in 2011
Airlines based in Florida
Companies based in Broward County, Florida
Privately held companies based in Florida
Regional Airline Association members
Regional airlines of the United States
American companies established in 2011